Darlington Football Club, an English association football club based in Darlington, County Durham, was founded in 1883. They entered the FA Cup for the first time in 1885–86, were founder members of the Northern League in 1889, turned professional in 1908 and joined the North Eastern League, which they won in 1913 and 1921. The latter win preceded election to the Football League as members of its newly formed Third Division North. Runners-up in their first season, Darlington were Northern Section champions three years later, thus winning promotion to the Second Division. Their 15th-place finish in 1926 remains their best League performance, and they were relegated back to the Third Division the following year. After 68 years of continuous membership, they were relegated from the Football League in 1988–89. Having made an immediate return as Conference champions, they remained in the League until 2010, when they again dropped into the Conference. After Darlington failed to exit administration in a manner acceptable to the Football Association, that body treated it as a new club, required it to change its name (to Darlington 1883), and placed its team in the Northern League, the ninth tier of English football, for the 2012–13 season. Five years later, the FA approved the club's request to resume its traditional name.

The club's first team have competed in numerous nationally organised competitions, and all players who have played in 100 or more such matches, either as a member of the starting eleven or as a substitute, are listed below. Each player's details include the duration of his Darlington career, his typical playing position while with the club, and the number of games played and goals scored in domestic league matches and in all senior competitive matches. Where applicable, the list also includes the national team for which the player was selected, and the number of senior international caps he won.

Introduction 

Of the more than 150 men who made 100 or more appearances in nationally organised league competition for Darlington, Alan Walsh and Jerry Best are first and second in the club's all-time scorers list. Davie Brown scored a club record 39 league goals in a single season, from 40 matches in 1924–25 as Darlington were promoted to the Second Division for the only time in their history. Frank Gray, Ken Hale and Billy Horner went on to manage the club, while Craig Liddle and Neil Maddison had several spells as caretaker manager.

Other players took part in significant matches in the history of the club. On the opening day of the 1921–22 season, Tommy Winship crossed for Bill Hooper to score Darlington's first Football League goal, against Halifax Town; the goal came so quickly that the Northern Echo reported how Hooper could "in all probability, lay claim to the honour of being the first player to score a goal in the Northern Section of the Third Division". Hughie Dickson scored the second with a penalty kick to make the score 2–0, and George Malcolm, the club's first Football League captain, and Tommy Greaves also played in the match. Dan Cassidy scored the last-seconds winner to defeat Stockport County in the inaugural Northern Section Cup final in 1934. Dave Carr and Keith Morton scored two of the goals that earned Darlington a draw with Chelsea, League champions only three seasons earlier, in the fourth round of the 1958–59 FA Cup, and Carr scored again as Darlington won the replay 4–1 to progress to the last 16 of the competition for only the second time in their history. Ray Yeoman captained the team to promotion from the Fourth Division in 1965–66, and Ian Miller was captain and Paul Arnison, Liam Hatch and Sam Russell also played as Darlington won the 2011 FA Trophy Final.

Ten men listed heregoalkeeper Mark Prudhoe, defenders Ron Greener, Liddle, Kevan Smith and John Peverell, midfielders Andy Toman, Alan Sproates and David McLean, and forwards Walsh and Colin Sinclairwere voted by supporters into a "Dream Team" as part of the 2003 Farewell to Feethams celebrations, when the club left its long-time home. The eleventh man, Marco Gabbiadini, played only 98 times for Darlington. Ron Ferguson's goal that eliminated Sheffield Wednesday from the 1976–77 FA Cup was chosen best goal ever scored at the ground.

Key

The list is ordered first by number of appearances in total, then by number of League appearances, and then if necessary by date of debut.
Appearances as a substitute are included.
Statistics are correct up to and including 1 July 2022, the first match of Darlington's 2022–23 season. Where a player left the club permanently after this date, his statistics are updated to his date of leaving.

Players with 100 or more appearances

Players with fewer appearances

Notes

Player statistics include games played while on loan from:

References
Appearances and goals

Specific

Sources
 
 

Players
 
Darlington
Players
Association football player non-biographical articles